Owen Dale (born 1 November 1998) is an English professional footballer who plays as a winger for Portsmouth, on loan from Blackpool. Signed from Crewe Alexandra in January 2022, he has previously also played for Witton Albion and Altrincham.

Career

Crewe Alexandra
Dale signed professional terms with Crewe in March 2016. He made his debut on 29 August 2017, coming on as a 70th minute substitute for Charlie Kirk in an EFL Trophy group stage game against Newcastle United U21s at Gresty Road. He made his league debut in Crewe's next game, coming on as a second-half substitute for Callum Ainley at Grimsby Town on 2 September 2017.

In November 2017, Dale joined Witton Albion, initially on a month's loan, later extended to the end of the 2017–18 season, scoring five times in 25 first team appearances. In August 2018, Dale joined Altrincham on a month's loan (later extended by a further month) making his debut at Darlington on 25 August. He scored his first Altrincham goal, the opener in a 3–1 home win against Alfreton Town, on 13 October 2018. He returned to his parent club in November 2018 after impressing during his time with Altrincham.

Dale scored his first senior goal for Crewe in a 6–1 defeat of Crawley Town at Gresty Road on 16 March 2019. After 26 appearances as a substitute, he made his first start in a Crewe shirt against Salford City at Gresty Road on 21 September 2019.

A contract extension clause was triggered by Crewe in June 2020. After scoring four goals in four games, Dale was named EFL League One Player of the Month for December 2020. In Crewe's end-of-season awards, Dale won four awards including Player of the Season.

Blackpool (loan)
Dale joined Blackpool on 1 September 2021. This was initially reported as a £500,000 transfer deal, but was later confirmed as a loan deal, with the option to complete a transfer in January 2022. He scored on his debut for the Lancashire club, shortly after coming on as a second-half substitute in Blackpool's 3–2 victory at Reading on 20 October 2021; he also provided an assist for one of Blackpool's other goals.Reading 2–3 Blackpool – BBC Sport, 20 October 2021. Retrieved: 21 October 2021. However, he made just six further appearances, and returned, unfit to play, to Crewe on 11 January 2022.

Blackpool
On 13 January 2022, Blackpool signed Dale, for an undisclosed fee, on a two-year contract. On 26 April 2022, he scored his first goal as a permanent Blackpool player, in a 2–0 victory against Barnsley at Oakwell.

Portsmouth (loan)
On 7 August 2022, Dale joined Portsmouth on loan for the remainder of the 2022–23 season, making his first Pompey start in a 3–0 EFL League Cup first round win at Cardiff City on 9 August 2022, and scoring his first goal in a 3–1 victory against Bristol Rovers on 20 August 2022.

Career statistics

Honours

Club
Crewe Alexandra
League Two runner-up: 2019–20

Individual
Crewe Alexandra Player of the Year: 2020–21
League One Player of the Month: December 2020

References

External links
Owen Dale's stats – Soccerbase

1998 births
Living people
English footballers
English Football League players
Crewe Alexandra F.C. players
Blackpool F.C. players
Portsmouth F.C. players
Association football midfielders
Witton Albion F.C. players
Altrincham F.C. players
Northern Premier League players
National League (English football) players